Nipple Wrench can refer to:

A Spoke wrench, a tool for tightening wheel spokes
A Nipple wrench, a plumbing tool
A Nipple wrench, a black-powder firearm tool